The Dam on the Yellow River (released in UK as Last Train to Shanghai) is a 1960 Italian-French drama film written and directed by Renzo Merusi.

Plot 
In China, during the civil war, Mao Tse Tung overrides the retreating nationalists. The rebels decide, at the cost of causing millions of victims, to blow up the dam on the Yellow River.

Cast 
 Anita Ekberg: Miss Dorothy Simmons 
 Georges Marchal: John Bell 
 Franca Bettoia: Sister Celeste 
 George Wang: Wang (credited as Wang Jie) 
 José Jaspe: Slansky 
 Dori Dorika: Mamie 
 Claudio Biava: Anak, Wang's Partner  
 Miranda Campa: Mary 
 Fanfulla  
 Liana Del Balzo

References

External links

1960 films
Italian drama films
French drama films
1960 drama films
1960s French films
1960s Italian films